Nattawut Pimpa (born 1986) is a Thai gymnast who is a member of the Aerobic Gymnastics National Thailand team,  coached by Desislava Bogusheva (BUL). 

Pimpa competed in the 2005, 2007 and 2011 Sea Games.  He was a Gold medalist, amultiple World Cup medalist and  participated at sixAerobic Gymnastics World Championships.

Pimpa is the first Thai gymnast to have an element named after him in the Aerobic Gymnastics Code of Points, awarded by  Fédération Internationale de Gymnastique (FIG), with the highest possible score of 1.0 point per single gymnastics skill.

References

1986 births
Living people
Nattawut Pimpa
Male aerobic gymnasts
Nattawut Pimpa
Nattawut Pimpa
Southeast Asian Games medalists in gymnastics
Competitors at the 2005 Southeast Asian Games
Competitors at the 2007 Southeast Asian Games
Competitors at the 2011 Southeast Asian Games